A Good Day to Have an Affair is a 2007 South Korean film. The story deals with two lonely housewives who get involved in extramarital affairs.

Title
바람피다 is a Korean idiom that means "to cheat". 바람 = wind, 피다 = to smoke. When you cheat on your spouse, you go back home so fast that even the wind burns (a rough translation).

Plot
Two bored housewives have affairs with two different men that they meet in online chatrooms. As their online relationships develop offline, they often pass each other unwittingly in the hallways of the motels where they meet their lovers.

One day, the lady known as “Dew” is in a motel room with her college-aged lover. Suddenly, her husband bursts through the door, along with police officers that he has brought along. The other lady, known as “Small Bird”, is in an adjacent room listening to what's going on in Dew's room. Small Bird whispers to her lover to be quiet, because the police officer in the other room is her husband.

Cast
Kim Hye-soo ... Dew
Yoon Jin-seo ... Small Bird
Jung Eun-pyo
Lee Jong-hyuk ... Fox
Lee Min-ki ... Student
 Kim Young-woong ... Neighborhood police officer

A Good Day to Have an Affair was the feature film debut of Lee Min-ki. The actor that played Dew's husband, Park Sang-myun, is the same man who played the aloof husband in My Wife is a Gangster (2001).

References

External links 
  

2007 films
2007 romantic comedy films
South Korean romantic comedy films
Adultery in films
Cinema Service films
2000s Korean-language films
2000s South Korean films